Anthony Kukwa (born October 30, 1992) is an American football long snapper who is a free agent. He initially attended Ball State University and later transferred to Lake Erie College, where he played long snapper and tight end. Kukwa is Lake Erie's first ever student-athlete to sign an NFL contract.

Professional career

Oakland Raiders
Kukwa signed with the Oakland Raiders as an undrafted free agent on May 5, 2017. He was waived by the Raiders on July 7, 2017.

Los Angeles Chargers
On January 4, 2018, Kukwa signed a reserve/future contract with the Los Angeles Chargers. On May 30, 2018, he was waived by the Chargers.

Houston Texans
Kukwa had a mini-camp tryout with the Houston Texans in 2019, but was not signed to a contract. He signed with the team on April 25, 2020. He was waived on July 27, 2020. Kukwa had a tryout with the Texans on August 20, 2020, and re-signed with the team three days later. He was waived on September 5, 2020. On December 15, 2020, Kukwa made his first official NFL regular season roster, by being signed to the 2020 Houston Texans Practice Squad.
 He signed a reserve/future contract on January 4, 2021. He was waived on March 23, 2021.

References

External links
 Lake Erie profile

1992 births
Living people
American football long snappers
Ball State Cardinals football players
Lake Erie Storm football players
Oakland Raiders players
Los Angeles Chargers players
People from Perry, Ohio
Players of American football from Ohio
Houston Texans players
American football tight ends